Sound on Sound Fest (often abbreviated as SOS Fest) was a three-day music, comedy, action sports and camping festival held 35 miles east of downtown Austin, Texas, at the Sherwood Forest Faire, home to an annual renaissance fair, and medieval-style village, set on 23 acres and located in the heart of the Lost Pines Forest region of Central Texas. 

SOS Fest celebrated its inaugural year November 4–6, 2016 with notable performers such as Beach House, Phantogram, Young Thug, Courtney Barnett, Death Grips, Tim Heidecker and more.

Founded by Austin-based promotions company Margin Walker Presents and produced by Funhouse Services and Sound on Sound Event Services, SOS Fest was home to three music stages showcasing emerging and established talent from the worlds of indie, punk, hip hop, metal, and dance music, as well as comedy. 

Created by Graham Williams and much of the same team behind the long-running Fun Fun Fun Fest, SOS Fest aimed to bring the same Austin-centric culture to the forest by including many local businesses, food trucks, restaurants and nonprofits as official vendors of the fest.

With a fan focus, SOS took the festival beyond the music with a comedy and live-panel discussion stage, a skateboard and BMX halfpipe, a wrestling ring, a disco dungeon, and 15 acres of camping. The festival also incorporated the renaissance theme of Sherwood Forest Faire into the daily fest activities with period actors roaming the grounds, jousting, turkey legs, and SOS Fest's own fire-breathing dragon that lives at the top of the main stage.

SOS Fest was scheduled to return for its second year on November 10–12, 2017 at Sherwood Forest, but was canceled by organizers on October 6.

Lineup

2016

Friday 
 Phantogram
 Descendents
 Thundercat
 Run the Jewels
 Fidlar
 Thee Oh Sees
 Hinds
 Touche Amore
 Death Grips
 Guided By Voices
 Empress Of
 Turnstile
 The Range
 Denzel Curry
 Clipping.
 Beach Slang
 Cursive
 Into It Over It
 Good Riddance
 Shannon and the Clams
 SWMRS
 Planes Mistaken for Stars
 Diet Cig
 Magna Carda
 War on Women
 Calliope Musicals
 Protextor
 Piñata Protest
 Boyfrndz
 Drug Church
 This is Spinal Tap
 Todd Barry
 Johnny Pemberton
 Yung Jake
 One Night Stand Dating Game
 The Needle Drop Podcast
 SOS Live Podcast
 Laugh Dammit

Saturday 
 Purity Ring
 Boys Noize
 Dillinger Escape Plan
 Aesop Rock
 Youth of Today
 Beach House
 Flag
 Girls Against Boys
 Metz
 Jagwar Ma
 Big Boi
 Deerhunter
 Car Seat Headrest
 Diarrhea Planet
 Pouya
 Health
 Small Black
 Alex G
 Dead Milkmen
 Wild Nothing
 Bleached
 American Sharks
 The Relationship
 Orthy
 Radioactivity
 Hardproof
 Tiny Moving Parts
 US Weekly
 Moving Panoramas
 Anya
 Culture Abuse
 Statesman Shots Podcast
 Tim Heidecker
 Joe Mande
 Air Sex Championships
 Turned Out A Punk
 SOS Live Podcast
 Catherine & Ryan's Wedding
 Fragile Rock

Sunday 
 Explosions in the Sky
 A-Trak
 Carcass
 Courtney Barnett
 Big Freedia
 Baroness
 STRFKR
 Protomartyr
 Young Thug
 Bob Mould
 White Lung
 Thursday
 Baio
 The Monkey Wrench
 Kero Kero Bonito
 Cherubs
 Recover
 Open Mike Eagle
 Old Man Gloom
 Youth Code
 The Frights
 Bully
 Night Drive
 Illustrations
 Leopold & His Fiction
 Boombaptist
 Die Young
 Emily Wolfe
 Psychic Twin
 Sailor Poon

External links 
 Official Website

References 

Festivals in Austin, Texas
Music of Austin, Texas
Hip hop music festivals in the United States
Rock festivals in the United States
Punk rock festivals
Indie rock festivals
Comedy festivals in the United States